Christopher Rasmus Nilsson Telo (born 4 November 1989), known as Christopher Telo, is an English-born Swedish footballer who plays for IFK Norrköping as a left back. He is the son of a Swedish mother and a Portuguese father.

Career

Club

IFK Norrköping
In the 2015 season, Telo played 23 league games for Norrköping who became Swedish champions by winning Allsvenskan.

Molde
On 28 July 2017, Telo signed for Molde FK on a contract until the end of the 2020 season. He was injury-plagued during his first year at the club. On 26 July 2019, Molde announced that Telo and Molde had agreed to terminate his contract one and a half year before its end date. He played a total of 10 games for Molde.

Return to IFK Norrköping
On 27 July 2019, the day after his contract with Molde was terminated, Telo agreed to rejoin IFK Norrköping.

Career statistics

Club

Honours
IFK Norrköping
Allsvenskan: 2015

References

External links
  (archive)

1989 births
Living people
Footballers from Greater London
Swedish people of Portuguese descent
Swedish footballers
Sweden youth international footballers
Swedish expatriate footballers
Association football midfielders
IFK Norrköping players
Allsvenskan players
Superettan players
Molde FK players
Eliteserien players
Expatriate footballers in Norway
Swedish people of Brazilian descent
Swedish expatriate sportspeople in Norway